Proctoporus is a genus of medium-sized lizards (snout-vent length between  and ) assigned to the family Gymnophthalmidae. Species in the genus Proctoporus occur in Yungas forests and wet montane grasslands on the upper edge of the Amazonian forest, between  elevation, from Central Peru in the north to Central Bolivia in the south.

Taxonomy

Species 
The following 21 species are recognized as being valid.
Proctoporus bolivianus  – Bolivian lightbulb lizard
Proctoporus carabaya 
Proctoporus cephalolineatus 
Proctoporus chasqui 
Proctoporus guentheri  – Günther's lightbulb lizard 
Proctoporus iridescens 
Proctoporus katerynae 
Proctoporus kiziriani 
Proctoporus lacertus 
Proctoporus laudahnae 
Proctoporus machupicchu  – Machu Picchu Andean lizard
Proctoporus oreades 
Proctoporus optimus 
Proctoporus otishi 
Proctoporus pachyurus  - Tschudi's lightbulb lizard
Proctoporus rahmi  - Rahm's sun tegu
Proctoporus spinalis  - Boulenger's sun tegu
Proctoporus sucullucu 
Proctoporus titans 
Proctoporus unsaacae 
Proctoporus xestus  - river teiid

Nota bene: A binomial authority in parentheses indicates that the species was originally described in a genus other than Proctoporus.

References

Further reading
Tschudi JJ de (1845). "Reptilium conspectus quae in Republica Peruana reperiuntur et pleraque observata vel collecta sunt in itinere ". Archiv für Naturgeschichte 11 (1): 150–170. (Proctoporus, new genus, p. 161; P. pachyurus, new species, p. 161). (in Latin).

 
Reptiles of Peru
Reptiles of Bolivia
Lizard genera
Taxa named by Johann Jakob von Tschudi